The striped Atlantic Forest rat (Delomys dorsalis) is a rodent species from South America. It is found in Argentina and Brazil.

References

Delomys
Mammals of Argentina
Mammals of Brazil
Mammals described in 1873